Hot corner may refer to:
 Baseball's third base position
 A screen hotspot for a computer mouse pointer
 A song from the 2008 album Funplex by the rock band The B-52s.